Mabini, officially the Municipality of Mabini, is a 3rd class municipality in the province of Pangasinan, Philippines. According to the 2020 census, it has a population of 26,454 people.

The municipality was formerly called Balincaguin.

History

The Municipality of Mabini used to be a part of the Province of Zambales and was surrounded by mountains, forests, and valleys. It was originally called "Balincaguin" that was derived from the Zambal phrase "Bali Lan Caguin" which means "abode of bats". This name referred to the nocturnal mammals (bats) that inhabited the caves found in the hills and mountains between the municipality and Zambales in the west and Tarlac to the south-west.

The place may have been founded in 1610 by Spanish missionaries who were Augustinian Recollects, although this is uncertain. In 1800, Balincaquin became a town under Don Isidro Puzon who is believed to be the founder. Some of its population (770 families) were Ilocanos who moved to the municipality due to its agricultural health. The site where these settlers situated near the mountains used to be called "Conventa."

Good quality rice was then consistently produced and marketed to Manila and even to China. Other products such as corn, sugar cane, cotton and so forth were also demanded and consequently, distributed widely through numerous markets. Apart from agriculture, the industry of saddle-making, knapsack-making and hat-weaving existed. The residents also engaged in tending cattle, carabaos, horses and goats. At the same time, gradual increase of the number of bats compelled the residents to catch them. These mammals were suspected of flying through the nearby forests because of the catching that lasted until 1930.

In 1930, the town's name was changed to Mabini in honor of Apolinario Mabini, who was considered as "The Great Sublime Paralytic" and "Brains of the Revolution."

The municipality was merged with Alaminos, Bani, Anda, Dasol, Burgos, Bolinao and Infanta in 1904 and presently comprises the province's first district.

Geography

Barangays
Mabini is politically subdivided into 16 barangays. These barangays are headed by elected officials: Barangay Captain, Barangay Council, whose members are called Barangay Councilors. All are elected every three years.

Climate

Demographics

Economy

Government
Mabini, belonging to the first congressional district of the province of Pangasinan, is governed by a mayor designated as its local chief executive and by a municipal council as its legislative body in accordance with the Local Government Code. The mayor, vice mayor, and the councilors are elected directly by the people through an election which is being held every three years.

Elected officials

List of municipal mayors

The municipal heads from the time when it was founded up to the present.

Gallery

See also
List of renamed cities and municipalities in the Philippines

References

External links

 Mabini Profile at PhilAtlas.com
 Official Website of the Municipal Government of Mabini, Pangasinan
  Municipal Profile at the National Competitiveness Council of the Philippines
 Mabini at the Pangasinan Government Website
 Local Governance Performance Management System
 [ Philippine Standard Geographic Code]
 Philippine Census Information

Municipalities of Pangasinan